Mount Franklin is located within Mount Aspiring National Park.

Franklin